The 2016–17 Buffalo Bulls women's basketball team represents the University at Buffalo during the 2016–17 NCAA Division I women's basketball season. The Bulls, led by fifth-year head coach Felisha Legette-Jack, play their home games at Alumni Arena as members of the East Division of the Mid-American Conference. They finished the season 22–10, 10–8 in MAC play to finish in third place in the East Division. They advanced to the semifinals of the MAC women's tournament where they lost to Toledo. Despite having 22 wins, they weren't invited to a postseason tournament.

Roster

Schedule
Source: 

|-
!colspan=9 style="background:#005BBB; color:white;"| Exhibition

|-
!colspan=9 style="background:#005BBB; color:white;"| Non-conference regular season

|-
!colspan=9 style="background:#005BBB; color:white;"| MAC regular season

|-
!colspan=9 style="background:#005BBB; color:white;"| MAC Women's Tournament

See also
2016–17 Buffalo Bulls men's basketball team

References

Buffalo
Buffalo Bulls women's basketball seasons
Buffalo Bulls
Buffalo Bulls